Hypodaria is a monotypic snout moth genus described by Friedrich Hartig in 1939. Its single species, Hypodaria myeloisiformis, described by the same author two years earlier, is found in Afghanistan.

References

Phycitinae
Monotypic moth genera
Moths of Asia